Gabriel Vidović (born 1 December 2003) is a professional footballer who plays as an attacking midfielder for Eredivisie club Vitesse, on loan from Bayern Munich. Born in Germany, he represents Croatia internationally.

Career
Vidović started his career playing for his hometown club, FC Augsburg. In 2016, he joined the Bayern Munich youth academy. After good performances for Bayern Munich II in the Regionalliga, he signed a new contract with Bayern Munich until 2025.

Later on, coach Julian Nagelsmann called him to join the first team, in which he earned his Bundesliga debut on 17 April 2022, coming on as a substitute to Serge Gnabry, in a 3–0 win over Arminia Bielefeld.

On 30 August 2022, Vidović joined Eredivisie club Vitesse on loan for the season.

International career
Born in Germany, Vidović is of Bosnian Croat descent. His father hails from Žepče and his mother hails from Kiseljak. He was called up to Germany U15 sides before he became part of various Croatian junior national teams.

Honours
Bayern Munich
 Bundesliga: 2021–22

References

External links
 

Bundesliga profile

2003 births
Living people
Sportspeople from Augsburg
Footballers from Bavaria
German people of Croatian descent
German people of Bosnia and Herzegovina descent
Association football midfielders
Association football forwards
German footballers
Croatian footballers
Croatia youth international footballers
Croatia under-21 international footballers
FC Bayern Munich II players
FC Bayern Munich footballers
SBV Vitesse players
Regionalliga players
Bundesliga players
Eredivisie players
Croatian expatriate footballers
Expatriate footballers in the Netherlands
Croatian expatriate sportspeople in the Netherlands